Asplundia brunneistigma is a species of largely terrestrial plant (although sometimes shortly climbing) belonging to the family Cyclanthaceae. It has a long stem up to 2 (exceptionally 3) m long bearing petioles up to 40 cm long terminating in shallowly bifid leaves up to 75 cm long.

This plant is found in primary rainforest habitats from Costa Rica to Panama.

References
New Species of Cyclanthaceae from southern Central America and northern South America

brunneistigma
Plants described in 2003